Clemens Raymond Hausmann (August 17, 1919 – August 29, 1972) was an American professional baseball pitcher. He played in Major League Baseball (MLB) from 1944 and 1949 for the Boston Red Sox (1944–1945) and Philadelphia Athletics (1949).

In a three-season career, Hausmann posted a 9–14 record with 73 strikeouts and a 4.21 ERA in 64 appearances, including 25 starts, seven complete games, two shutouts, 20 games finished, four saves, and 263.0  innings of work.
 
Hausmann died in Baytown, Texas at age 53.

Sources

Retrosheet

1919 births
1972 deaths
Boston Red Sox players
Philadelphia Athletics players
Major League Baseball pitchers
Baseball players from Texas
Minor league baseball managers
Refugio Oilers players
Greenville Lions (minor league) players
Borger Gassers players
Montgomery Rebels players
Dallas Rebels players
Newark Bears (IL) players
Kansas City Blues (baseball) players
Nashville Vols players
Los Angeles Angels (minor league) players
Buffalo Bisons (minor league) players
Dallas Eagles players
Longview Cherokees players